Pallini Limoncello is a brand of traditional Italian lemon-flavored liqueur known as Limoncello. It is produced by Pallini S.p.A., a family-owned and operated beverage company based in Rome, Italy. It has 26% alcoholic volume and 52 proof. The Limoncello was introduced in 1999 and is based on a 100-year-old Pallini family recipe. It is imported and distributed in the United States by Castle Brands Inc.

Company History
Nicola Pallini (b. 1851) was a prominent merchant in Antrodoco, a town in the Abruzzi region of Italy. His businesses included coal imports, banking, chestnut farms, and general stores, for which he produced wine and various cordials.

In 1922, the family moved the business to Rome. There it expanded its liquor production to include Mistra', an anise-based liqueur, and handcrafted Romana Sambuca.

In 1962, Giorgio and Nicola Pallini (Virgilio's sons) decided to move the company out of the centre of Rome to a larger, more modern facility, where it remains today.

Living in New York in the 1970s, Virgilio Pallini Jr (current President) negotiated distribution in the US. The effect of this was an explosion of Sambuca Romana. Romana, as well as Disaronno and Galliano, was among the first Italian liqueurs to penetrate the US market.

Today the brand is owned by Diageo, but Pallini remains the exclusive producer.

In 1999, the Pallini family introduced Pallini Limoncello, based on a traditional family recipe. Two more flavors, Pallini Raspicello and Pallini Peachello were also put into production.

Production 

Pallini Limoncello is made using sfusato lemons grown on the Amalfi Coast of Italy. The lemons arrived on the coast hundreds of years ago, carried by sailors from the Middle East. They have low acid levels and a delicate flavor and a thick peel, favorable qualities for the production of limoncello.

The lemons are handpicked, peeled and shipped to the production facility in Rome, where the lemon zest is steeped in neutral alcohol derived from sugar beets. This infusion process releases the oils in the zest into the alcohol, which imparts the lemon flavor. Beet sugar and E102 (Yellow 5) is then added to the infused alcohol, and it is bottled and shipped worldwide.

Certifications & identifications 
 PGI organic lemons
 Gluten-free
 Kosher
 GMO Free product
 Allergen (ex 2003/89) free
 Pure natural Italian sugar

Flavors 
 Limoncello – traditional lemon-flavored Italian digestif
 Raspicello – liqueur made with a blend of raspberries, blueberries, cassis and black currants (26.0% alcohol by volume)
 Peachello – liqueur made with Italian white peaches (26.0% alcohol by volume)

References

External links 

Pallini S.p.A. website
Castle Brands website

Italian liqueurs
Citrus liqueurs
Products introduced in 1999